Latoia is a genus of moths in the family Limacodidae. It was described by Félix Édouard Guérin-Méneville in 1844.

Species
Some species of this genus are:

Latoia albicosta (Hampson, 1910)
Latoia albifrons Guérin-Méneville, 1844
Latoia albilinea (Hampson, 1910)
Latoia anagaura Janse, 1964
Latoia canescens (Walker, 1855)
Latoia catalai Viette, 1980
Latoia chlorea Berio, 1939
Latoia chrysopa D. S. Fletcher, 1968
Latoia cineracea (Karsch, 1896)
Latoia cinnamomarea D. S. Fletcher, 1968
Latoia colini (Mabille, 1884)
Latoia cretata (Karsch, 1899)
Latoia decolor (Karsch, 1899)
Latoia eremotropha Janse, 1964
Latoia flavicosta (Hampson, 1910)
Latoia geminatus (Hering, 1957)
Latoia heringi (Viette, 1965)
Latoia heringiana Viette, 1980
Latoia johannes (Distant, 1898)
Latoia joiceyi Tams, 1929
Latoia latistriga (Walker, 1855)
Latoia lemuriensis (Viette, 1967)
Latoia loxotoma (Bethune-Baker, 1911)
Latoia lutunguru Dufrane, 1945
Latoia nana Holland, 1893
Latoia neglecta Hering, 1928
Latoia nivosa (Felder, 1874)
Latoia parniodes Hering, 1957
Latoia peyrierasi (Viette, 1965)
Latoia phlebodes (Karsch, 1896)
Latoia picta (Walker, 1855)
Latoia privativa Hering, 1928
Latoia procerus (Hering, 1957)
Latoia pumilus (Hering, 1957)
Latoia singularis (Butler, 1878)
Latoia urda (Druce, 1887)
Latoia vadoni Viette, 1980
Latoia viettei (Hering, 1957)
Latoia viridicosta (Hampson, 1910)
Latoia viridifascia Holland, 1893
Latoia viridimixta Janse, 1964
Latoia vitilena (Karsch, 1896)
Latoia vivida (Walker, 1865)

References

Limacodidae genera
Limacodidae
Taxa named by Félix Édouard Guérin-Méneville